The 1981 United States Grand Prix West (officially the Toyota Grand Prix of Long Beach) was a Formula One motor race held on March 15, 1981, at Long Beach, California. It was the opening race of the 1981 Formula One World Championship.

Summary
Defending World Champion Alan Jones finished nine seconds ahead of teammate Carlos Reutemann, and won his first Long Beach Grand Prix, as the 1981 season finally began after a winter of controversy and legal battles. It was the third consecutive Grand Prix win for Jones, and his second consecutive in the United States, after seizing the 1980 Drivers' title with season-ending wins in Montreal, Canada and Watkins Glen, New York.

The off-season had seen FISA (La Federation Internationale du Sport Automobile) and FOCA (the Formula One Constructors' Association) in conflict, ostensibly over FISA's scheduled ban of aerodynamic skirts on the cars, but also over financial control of the sport. After threatening to institute their own championship, FOCA agreed to the skirt ban on assurance of their continued control of the sport's finances and FISA's commitment to a four-year period of stability in the rules. Just 10 days prior to the season-opening race in Long Beach, the Concorde Agreement was signed in Paris, allowing all of the teams to appear.

In the meantime, the South African race, run in February under FOCA's pre-agreement version of the rules, had been deprived of its World Championship status by the dispute, and the Argentine race, originally scheduled in January, was moved to April.

In addition to the new rules, Goodyear announced in December that it intended to withdraw immediately from all involvement in European racing. So, when the teams arrived in Long Beach for the first Championship race of the season, the Friday morning practice sessions were filled with frantic activity. Larger wings, softer springs and revised sidepods were in evidence for nearly everyone, trying to make up for the absence of the banned skirts. With all teams also using Michelin tires as well, many drivers were struggling to come to grips with a totally new set of challenges.

When the teams arrived in the Los Angeles area town of Long Beach, the demanding and tight street circuit had been slightly modified from the year before- the second left-hander on Pine Avenue had been made a single-apex corner instead of a double-apex.

On Saturday, yet another legal issue arose over the new twin-chassis Lotus 88, designed by Colin Chapman and Martin Ogilvie. A protest was lodged by a majority of the teams, although they did not specify what rules it was breaking. The car was initially approved by the FISA technical staff and passed by the scrutineers, allowing it to take part in Friday practice. Ultimately, however, the teams' appeal was allowed, the car was banned from the rest of the weekend and Lotus had to qualify and race the more conventional Lotus 81.

On the track, in final qualifying, Riccardo Patrese and Alan Jones traded the top spot back and forth several times during the session. Patrese finally managed to take the pole, clinching his first ever and the first (and only) for his Arrows team, by .01 seconds. Jones's Williams teammate Reutemann was third, followed by Nelson Piquet's Brabham, the Ferrari of Gilles Villeneuve and Mario Andretti in his first race for Alfa Romeo. The all-American Tyrrell driver team had Eddie Cheever in eighth place, but Kevin Cogan missed the final qualifying spot by .07 seconds. It was the first time a Tyrrell had ever failed to make the grid.

Sunday's weather, typical of Long Beach was perfect, but the first lap was not. Villeneuve made a wild charge down the outside off the grid and briefly took the lead, but he left his braking for the Queens Hairpin far too late. As he went wide, Patrese and the Williams pair of Reutemann and Jones all went through. Villeneuve was able to gather it in and rejoin in fourth, but Andrea de Cesaris did not, as he ran his McLaren into the back of both Alain Prost and Héctor Rebaque approaching the hairpin. After being hit, Prost's Renault slid across the track and shoved the Brabham of Rebaque into the wall. Prost and de Cesaris were out on the spot, but Rebaque was able to continue after pitting for four new tires. After one lap, the order was Patrese, Reutemann, Jones, Villeneuve, Piquet, Didier Pironi, Cheever and Andretti.

For the first part of the race, Patrese led Reutemann by around one second with Jones another three seconds behind. Then, almost the length of the pit straight back, was Pironi, who had traded places with Villeneuve (fifth and third) but was now holding up a line of cars as Piquet desperately tried to get by.

Lap 17 was a bad one for Ferrari as Piquet finally passed Pironi for fourth, and Villeneuve retired with a broken driveshaft. On lap 25, Reutemann took the lead from Patrese just a lap before Patrese pitted with a misfiring engine. He rejoined the race with a new spark box, but after two more stops for the same problem, finally retired with a broken fuel pickup.

Patrese's retirement left Reutemann with a three-second lead over teammate Jones, who immediately began closing the gap by half a second per lap. Any questions about team orders letting the number one driver through were soon answered. On lap 32, while lapping Marc Surer's Ensign, Reutemann slid wide in the esses on Pine Avenue, and Jones went through for the lead. Within 12 laps, the defending World Champion had stretched out a lead of ten seconds. At the same time, Reutemann was extending his lead over Piquet to 36 seconds.

On lap 41, Jacques Laffite tried to go by Cheever as they entered the right-hander after the pits. Instead, he ran into the back of the Tyrrell, bending the nose of his Ligier and damaging Cheever's gearbox. Laffite had to limp around the entire course, and as he was finally about to enter the pits, Bruno Giacomelli approached, with Jan Lammers between the two of them. Giacomelli started to pass both cars on the inside, but realized he couldn't when Laffite turned to enter the pit lane. Giacomelli tried to go around Lammers on the other side, but it was too late. He ran over Lammers's ATS, pushing him into the wall.

Laffite's retirement interrupted an extended battle with Pironi, Cheever and Andretti for fourth place. Andretti passed Cheever for fifth on lap 43, then traded fourth several times with Pironi, before finally taking the position for good on lap 54. Pironi's Ferrari had developed a fuel feed problem and Cheever was also able to go by to take fifth. In making the pass, however, he lost his damaged second gear, by far the one most used on the tight street circuit.

The positions remained the same for the last quarter of the race with Jones and Reutemann easing up to take the third consecutive one-two for Williams. Piquet, having lost his shot at the leaders while bottled up behind Pironi, finished third, 35 seconds back. Mario Andretti thrilled the American crowd with his fourth place, just ahead of compatriot Eddie Cheever's Tyrrell in fifth. It was the first time for two Americans to finish in the points since Andretti and Mark Donohue at the 1975 Swedish Grand Prix.

Classification

Qualifying

Race

Championship standings after the race

Drivers' Championship standings

Constructors' Championship standings

Note: Only the top five positions are included for both sets of standings.

References

Further reading
 Rob Walker (June 1981). "6th United States Grand Prix West: Harmony Restored". Road & Track, 160–165.
 Mike S. Lang (1992). Grand Prix!: Race-by-race account of Formula 1 World Championship motor racing. Volume 4: 1981 to 1984. Haynes Publishing Group. 

United States Grand Prix West
United States Grand Prix West
United States Grand Prix West
United States Grand Prix West